Data Garden is an arts organization and independent record label formed by Joe Patitucci and Alex Tyson in 2011.

Label activity
In conjunction with releasing music downloads on plantable artwork, Data Garden has produced installations and events at The Philadelphia Museum of Art, The Noguchi Museum, Institute of Contemporary Art Philadelphia, SXSW Festival, and Bartram’s Garden in Philadelphia, among others. Data Garden has received grants from The Pew Center for Arts & Heritage.

In 2014, Data Garden launched the MIDI Sprout, a bio-sonification device. The converter enables musicians to use plants and other living matter as MIDI triggers for electronic music and research. The device was developed with engineer Sam Cusumano and was inspired by the work of Richard Lowenberg, Cleve Backster and Mileece.

Discography
Alex Tyson, Aquaglass, DG013
Beep!, Too Physical, DG012
Telequanta, Metaverse, DG011
Greg Fox (Guardian Alien, Zs), Mitral Transmission, DG010
Ben Warfield, Songs of Light & Dust, DG009
Moan (Shinji Masuko of Boredoms), Bookshelf Sanctuary, DG008
The Thangs, Wedodo, DG007
Data Garden, Live at the Switched-On Garden, DG006
King Britt, The Bee & The Stamen, DG005
Spaceship Aloha (Christopher Powell of Need New Body, Man Man), Universe Mahalo Vol. #1, DG004
Data Garden, Quartet: Live at the Philadelphia Museum of Art, DG003
Cheap Dinosaurs, Cheap Dinosaurs, DG002
Ray & The Prisms, Timelapse in Colour, DG001
Tadoma, Field Notes, DG000

Curated events
 The Switched-On Garden 001, Bartram's Garden
 Computer Groove, Little Berlin Gallery
 The Switched-On Garden 002, Bartram's Garden
Hidden City Festival (Contemporary Archives, A\V Archaeology, Heritage Electronics)
Art Splash at the Philadelphia Museum of Art

Sound installations
Data Garden Quartet, The Philadelphia Museum of Art
A\V Archaeology, Hidden City Festival
Duet, Center for PostNatural History
Personified, Noguchi Museum
Hexidecibel, CCNH
Personified, Institute of Contemporary Art – Philadelphia
Duet, Bang Pop Festival/ SXSW

See also
 List of record labels
 List of electronic music record labels

References

American independent record labels
Record labels established in 2011